Marietta is an unincorporated community in Marshall County, Kansas, United States.

History
Marietta was named for Mrs. Marieta Mann. Marietta had a post office from 1895 until 1959.

Education
The community is served by Marysville USD 364 public school district.

References

Further reading

External links
 Marshall County maps: Current, Historic, KDOT

Unincorporated communities in Marshall County, Kansas
Unincorporated communities in Kansas